Matthew Aaron Hill (1915–1968) was an English professional footballer who played in the Football League for Mansfield Town.

References

1915 births
1968 deaths
English footballers
Association football forwards
English Football League players
Carlisle United F.C. players
Mansfield Town F.C. players